Dariusz Paweł Dziekanowski (born 30 September 1962) is a Polish football player, coach and commentator. He was known as Jacki Dziekanowski during his time playing in the Scottish and English leagues. He started his career at Polonia Warsaw, between 1973–79, throughout the youth set-up and into a very young first team, but went to Gwardia Warszawa from 1979–83.

Having not impressed the coach during his final season he moved to Widzew Łódź in 1985. However, the following year he was selected in the Poland 1986 FIFA World Cup squad. He won the Polish Cup in 1989. He also had a minor career in archery, in 1988. He decided to move to Celtic in 1989 and became a fan favourite after scoring an amazing four goals in a nail-biting European Cup Winners' Cup tie against Partizan Belgrade. He left Celtic to join Bristol City in 1992.

Troubled years followed where he travelled all around Europe, but eventually he found himself settled back in Warsaw in his retirement season of 1996/97. Since his retirement, he has worked in Polish television as a football commentator. From July 2006 to May 2008 he was an assistant to Leo Beenhakker for the Poland national football team.

Honours

Club

Widzew Łódź

 Polish Cup: 1985

Legia Warsaw

 Ekstraklasa: 1994
 Polish Cup: 1989, 1994

Country
Poland

 Nehru Cup: 1984

Individual

 Ekstraklasa topscorer: 1988 (20 goals)

References

External links
 
 

1962 births
Living people
Footballers from Warsaw
Polish footballers
1986 FIFA World Cup players
Poland international footballers
Poland youth international footballers
Polonia Warsaw players
Gwardia Warsaw players
Widzew Łódź players
Legia Warsaw players
Celtic F.C. players
Bristol City F.C. players
Alemannia Aachen players
1. FC Köln players
Polish expatriate footballers
Expatriate footballers in Scotland
Expatriate footballers in England
Expatriate footballers in Germany
Ekstraklasa players
Scottish Football League players
English Football League players
Association football forwards